Pyrococcus horikoshii is a hyperthermophilic, anaerobic archaeon, first isolated from hydrothermal fluid samples obtained at the Okinawa Trough vents at a depth of . It is obligately heterotrophic, cells are irregular cocci with a tuft of flagella, growing optimally at 98 °C, sulphur greatly enhancing its growth.

References

Further reading

External links 

WORMS entry
LPSN
Type strain of Pyrococcus horikoshii at BacDive -  the Bacterial Diversity Metadatabase

Archaea described in 1993
Euryarchaeota